Andrew Hudgins (born 22 April 1951 Killeen, Texas) is an American poet.

Biography
Hudgins was raised in Alabama. He earned a B.A. at Huntingdon College, an M.A. at the University of Alabama, and an M.F.A. at the University of Iowa. He is the author of numerous collections of poetry and essays, many of which have received high critical praise, such as The Never-Ending: New Poems (1991), which was a finalist for the National Book Awards; After the Lost War: A Narrative (1988), which received the Poets' Prize; and Saints and Strangers (1985), which was a finalist for the Pulitzer Prize. Hudgins is an elected member of the Fellowship of Southern Writers and a frequent Sewanee Writers' Conference faculty member. He is currently Humanities Distinguished Professor of English at Ohio State University. He previously taught at Baylor University and the University of Cincinnati. Hudgins lives in Upper Arlington, Ohio, with his wife, the writer Erin McGraw.

Bibliography

Poetry 
Collections
 
 
 
 
 
 
 
 
 

List of poems

Nonfiction
 
 
 
 Reprinted in

Notes

1951 births
Living people
20th-century American essayists
20th-century American male writers
20th-century American poets
American male essayists
American male poets
The Atlantic (magazine) people
Ohio State University faculty
People from Upper Arlington, Ohio
21st-century American essayists
21st-century American male writers
21st-century American poets
Poets from Ohio
Poets from Alabama
Huntingdon College alumni
University of Alabama alumni
University of Iowa alumni
Baylor University faculty
University of Cincinnati faculty